Seduced and Abandoned may refer to:

 Seduced and Abandoned (1964 film), an Italian film
 Seduced and Abandoned (2013 film), a documentary film
 Seduced and Abandoned (album), a 1987 album by Hue and Cry